This is a list of new media artists who work primarily in the medium of the new media art.

A
 American Artist
 Andrea Ackerman
 Annie Abrahams
 Robert Adrian
 Morehshin Allahyari
 Miguel Álvarez-Fernández
 Carlos Amorales
 Anna Anthropy
 Cory Arcangel
 Deborah Aschheim
 Roy Ascott

B
 Aram Bartholl
 Sandra Becker
 Zoe Beloff
 Maurice Benayoun
 Wafaa Bilal
 Jeremy Blake
 Guy Bleus
 Maurizio Bolognini
 Sylvia Grace Borda
 Candice Breitz
 Veronika Bromová
 Nia Burks
 Oleg Buryan

C
 C6.org
F. Lennox Campello
 Micha Cárdenas
 Janet Cardiff
 Shu Lea Cheang
 Jennifer Chan (artist)
 Brody Condon
 Petra Cortright
 Vuk Ćosić
 Beatriz da Costa
 Andrea Crespo
 Amanda Cox
 Donna Cox
 Critical Art Ensemble
 Nick Crowe

D
 Sharon Daniel
 Liu Dao
 Char Davies
 Ronald Davis
 Heiko Daxl
 Linda Dement
 Danny Devos
 Heather Dewey-Hagborg
Marco Donnarumma
R. Luke DuBois

E
 Electronic Disturbance Theater
 Arthur Elsenaar
 David Em
 Ursula Endlicher

F
 Ken Feingold
 Thomas Feuerstein
 Mary Flanagan
 Amy Franceschini
 Monika Fleischmann 
 Anna Frants
 Peter Foldes
 Fred Forest
 Ingeborg Fülepp

G
 Carla Gannis
 Rick Gibson
 Ken Goldberg
 Guillermo Gómez-Peña
 Johannes Grenzfurthner
 greyworld
 Genco Gulan

H
 Claudia Hart
 Auriea Harvey
 Kurt Hentschlager
 Lynn Hershman
 Garnet Hertz
 Andreas Heusser
 Gary Hill
 Perry Hoberman
 Tiffany Holmes
 Marc Horowitz
 G. H. Hovagimyan

 Jonty Hurwitz

I
 Ryoji Ikeda
 Toshio Iwai
 Neema Iyer

J
 Helen Varley Jamieson
 E. Jane
 Daniel Jolliffe

K
 Eduardo Kac
 Allan Kaprow
John Klima (artist)
 Mario Klingemann
 KMA
 Knifeandfork
 Knowbotic Research
 Aaron Koblin
 Myron Krueger
 Petri Kuljuntausta
 Ryota Kuwakubo

L 
 LaBeouf, Rönkkö & Turner
 Antoinette LaFarge
 Roy LaGrone
 Steve Lambert
 Ulf Langheinrich
 Marc Lee
 Jan Robert Leegte
 Golan Levin
 Jen Lewin
 LIA
 Olia Lialina
 Patrick Lichty
 Lin Hsin Hsin
 Marita Liulia
 Teddy Lo
 Andy Lomas
 Gretta Louw
 Rafael Lozano-Hemmer
 Garrett Lynch

M
 John Maeda
 Judy Malloy
 Sergio Maltagliati
 Michael Mandiberg
 Miltos Manetas
 Lev Manovich
 Cathy Marshall
 Mauro Martino
 Eva and Franco Mattes
 Rita McKeough
 Christina McPhee
 Yucef Merhi
 Elle Mehrmand
 Bjørn Melhus
 Neil Mendoza
 Rosa Menkman
 Eric Millikin
 Christian Moeller
 Francesco Monico
 Manfred Mohr
 Joshua Mosley
 Leonel Moura
Liz Mputu

N
 Michael Naimark
 Mark Napier (artist)
 Joseph Nechvatal
 Kingsley Ng
 Carsten Nicolai
 Graham Nicholls
 Nsumi

O
 Mendi & Keith Obadike
 Erwin Olaf
 Marisa Olson
 Anuska Oosterhuis
 Joseph Stanislaus Ostoja-Kotkowski

P
 Nam June Paik
 Zaven Paré
 Chiara Passa
 Eric Paulos
 Simon Penny
 Maja Petrić
 Dani Ploeger
 Andrea Polli
 Jim Pomeroy

R
 Sabrina Raaf
 Melinda Rackham
 Catherine Richards
 Ken Rinaldo
 Don Ritter
 David Rokeby
 Gustavo Romano
 Daniel Rozin
Stepan Ryabchenko

S
 Jason Salavon
 Daan Samson
 Ellen Sandor
 Thyra Schmidt
 Antoine Schmitt
 Lillian Schwartz
 Adrien Segal
 Paul Sermon
 Marie Sester
 Jeffrey Shaw
 Laila Shereen Sakr
 Alexei Shulgin
 Scott Snibbe
 Konstantia Sofokleous
 Anne Morgan Spalter
 Jonas Staal
 Stelarc
 Igor Štromajer
 System D-128

T 
 Tim Tate
 Tamiko Thiel
 Helen Thorington
 Tinkebell
 Thomson & Craighead
 Elena Tejada-Herrera
 Kenneth Tin-Kin Hung
 Timo Toots
 Ryan Trecartin
 Suzanne Treister

U
 Ubermorgen
 Amalia Ulman
 Camille Utterback

V
 Bill Viola
 VNS Matrix
 Wolf Vostell

W
 Addie Wagenknecht
 Tamás Waliczky
 Lee Walton
 Noah Wardrip-Fruin
 Angela Washko
 Martin Wattenberg
 Gillian Wearing
 Lee Wells
 Norman White

Z
Pedro Zaz

See also
 Interactive Art
 Interactive Media
 Artmedia
 ISEA International

References

 Bullivant, Lucy (2007). 4dsocial: interactive Design Environments (Architectural Design). London: John Wiley & Sons. .
 Bullivant, Lucy (2006). Responsive Environments: architecture, art and design (V&A Contemporary). London: Victoria and Albert Museum. .
 Bullivant, Lucy (2005). 4dspace: Interactive Architecture (Architectural Design). London: John Wiley & Sons. .
 Paul, Christiane (2003). Digital Art (World of Art series). London: Thames & Hudson. .
 Weibel, Peter and Shaw (2003) Jeffrey, Future Cinema, MIT Press, pp. 472,572-581, .
 Wilson, Steve (2002). Information Arts: Intersections of Art, Science, and Technology. .

Media artists, List of